Rao Kashif Rahim Khan is a Pakistani politician who was a Member of the Provincial Assembly of the Punjab, from 2008 to May 2018.

Early life and education
He was born on 1 March 1970 in Samundri.

He has a degree of Master of Arts which obtained in 1996 and a degree of Bachelor of Laws he received in 2001 from Punjab University Law College.

Political career
He was elected to the Provincial Assembly of the Punjab as a candidate of Pakistan Muslim League (N) (PML-N) from Constituency PP-60 (Faisalabad-X) in 2008 Pakistani general election. He received 21,664 votes and defeated a candidate of Pakistan Muslim League (Q).

He was re-elected to the Provincial Assembly of the Punjab as a candidate of PML-N from Constituency PP-60 (Faisalabad-X) in 2013 Pakistani general election.

References

Living people
Punjab MPAs 2013–2018
Punjab MPAs 2008–2013
1970 births
Pakistan Muslim League (N) politicians
Punjab University Law College alumni
People from Faisalabad